Chengdu Metro Line 9 is located in Chengdu, Sichuan and forms an extension to the existing Chengdu Metro system. The line officially opened on 18 December 2020.

Line 9's color is bright orange.

It is the first ever fully automated ATO GoA 4 metro line in Chengdu. 

Line 9 uses high capacity Type A 8-car trains. The 13 stations were designed by London-based Sepanta in collaboration with Chinese architect Jiang & Associates Design.

Progress 

 On July 11, 2016, the NDRC approved the third phase of expansion for the Chengdu Metro consisting of Line 6 phase 2 and 3, Line 8, Line 9, Line 10 Phase 2, Line 17 Phase 1 and Line 18.

2016-12-29, Sichuan and the Sichuan Development and Reform Commission approved and officially agreed to construct Line 1 Phase 1. The first 4 stations started construction on the same day.

2017-11-10, Line 9's first tunnel machine started work at Yuanhua Depot connection.

2018-3-17, Line 9's first section (Yuanhua Depot connection) finished tunnel work

2018-11-29, Line 9 started track-laying.

2019-01-22, first train is finished at CRRC Changchun Railway Vehicles.
 On July 18, 2019, the Wuqing Power Centre project is completed.

2019-07-30, Line 9 finished all tunnel work.

2020-01-14, as the last section of track is installed between Sanyuan and Jincheng Avenue Stations, completing track installation of Line 9 Phase I.

2020-06-10, Chengdu Metro started 3-month trial operation for Line 9 and Line 17.

Stations

References 

Chengdu Metro lines
Railway lines opened in 2020
2020 establishments in China
Automated guideway transit